Wendy Ann Ashmore (née Matthews; June 26, 1948 – January 8, 2019) was an American professor of Maya archaeology at the University of California, Riverside. She was involved in excavations in Belize, Guatemala, and Honduras. Her research focused on the implications that spaces, settlement patterns, and gender can have on social organization. She received her B.A. from the University of California, Los Angeles in 1970 and her Ph.D. in 1981 from the University of Pennsylvania. Her dissertation analyzed the results of the site periphery program that took place between 1975 and 1979 at Quirigua, Guatemala. In her dissertation, she discusses the use of random sampling in the Maya region and offers suggestions for how research might be carried out in that region in the future. Ashmore died in 2019 at her home in Riverside, California.

Landscape archaeology

She was particularly interested in landscape archaeology. In her book with Arthur Bernard Knapp, Archaeology of Landscape: Contemporary Perspectives, Ashmore discusses the importance of the landscape to ancient Maya ritual and religious life. This work emphasizes the social and symbolic role of the landscape on the development of Maya culture and identity. Knapp and Ashmore claim that although ideologically important landscapes are not always marked in ways that leave traces archaeologically, it is still possible to glean clues from the landscape about what was important to the people using it. One important factor to keep in mind when examining sacred landscapes is architectural mimicry, or designing a building or collection of buildings to resemble the natural landscape.  Examples of architectural mimicry include designing pyramids that resemble mountains or designing the layout of towns to resemble the area's natural topography.

Quirigua

In her article, Classic Maya Wells at Quirigua, Guatemala: Household Facilities in a Water-Rich Setting Ashmore argues that the presence of ceramic lined wells in eighth century Quirigua were an important innovation in spite of the fact that Quirigua was not a water-poor city.  Ashmore argues that too much theoretical emphasis is often placed on innovations that are developed as the result of threats to survival.  Even though there was always a ready supply of water available at Quirigua, the wells provide archaeologists with an excellent example of specialized Maya hydraulic technology.
  
In the article Playing with Power: Ballcourts and Ritual in Southern Mesoamerica with John Gerard Fox, John H. Blitz, Susan D. Gillespie, Stephen D. Houston, Ted J.J. Leyenaar, Joyce Marcus, Jerry D. Moore, Patricia A. Urban, Edward M. Shortman, and David Webster, Ashmore challenges the assumption that ballcourts functioned as public architecture in ancient Maya society.  It suggests alternately that they instead functioned as a “lived space” more closely resembling households and private dwellings than public architecture like temples.  The article argues that since the ballcourt was associated strongly with the supernatural, it functioned as a place where political and cosmological drama unfolded.

In the article Spatial Orders in Maya Civic Plans, Ashmore and Jeremy Sabloff address how the way the Maya laid out their cities, specifically their civic and ceremonial centers, reflects their beliefs about the universe and their place in it. They claim that landscape archaeology can be used to determine how the Maya conducted their politics and how they ran their government. Several archaeologists have criticized this approach for its lack of objectivity and for being ungrounded in empirical data. Critics have also claimed that it is too reliant on speculation.

Publications

References

External links
 

American archaeologists
1948 births
2019 deaths
University of Pennsylvania alumni
University of California, Riverside faculty
University of California, Los Angeles alumni
American women archaeologists
People from Los Angeles
21st-century American women